Ely Theological College was a college in Ely, Cambridgeshire, for training clergy in the Church of England.  Founded in 1876  by James Woodford, Anglican Bishop of Ely,  the college had a strong Anglo-Catholic tradition.  Ely's "ritualistic" (i.e. "Catholic") tendencies were attacked by Mr Samuel Smith MP in a House of Commons debate in 1899.

Because of its reputation for strong Anglo-Catholicism the clergy trained there had little hope of rising to senior positions in the church; the first one to become a diocesan bishop was Edward Wynn in 1941. (Eric Mascall in his autobiography expresses the opinion that there were few differences in doctrine or liturgy between Ely and the theological colleges of Cuddesdon and Lincoln.) The principal from 1891 to 1911 was B. W. Randolph (also a canon of the cathedral); he was succeeded by Charles John Smith (previously vice-principal) who maintained the customs established in Randolph's time. The vice-principal was then Harry Thomas, a former missionary who later became the suffragan bishop of Taunton.

The college closed in 1964.

Notable alumni

 Vigo Auguste Demant, Regius Professor of Moral and Pastoral Theology at Oxford University
 Alec Graham, Bishop of Newcastle
Henry Ernest Hardy, also known as “Father Andrew”, co-founding friar of the Society of Divine Compassion, parish priest serving the East End of London
 Brian Brindley, Anglo-Catholic canon and later convert to Roman Catholicism
 Eric Lionel Mascall, theologian

Notes and references

External links
 History of Guyhirn
 Ely Theological College, about 1960.

 
1876 establishments in England
1964 disestablishments in England
Anglican seminaries and theological colleges
Anglo-Catholic educational establishments
Educational institutions disestablished in 1964
Ely, Cambridgeshire
Former theological colleges in England
Anglican buildings and structures in the United Kingdom